Fodinoidea pluto is a moth of the family Erebidae. It was described by Hervé de Toulgoët in 1961. It is found on Madagascar.

Subspecies
Fodinoidea pluto pluto
Fodinoidea pluto celsicola Toulgoët, 1984

References

 

Spilosomina
Moths described in 1961